The 2016 UEC European Track Championships (under-23 & junior) were the 16th continental championships for European under-23 and junior track cyclists, and the 7th since the event was renamed following the reorganisation of European track cycling in 2010. The event took place at the Velodromo Fassa Bortolo in Montichiari, Italy from 12 to 17 July 2016.

Medal summary

Under 23

Junior

Notes
 In junior competitions, individual pursuits are contested over 3 km/2 km for men/women respectively.
 Competitors named in italics contested the qualifying rounds only.
 In the qualifying round, Olivija Baleišytė clocked a 2:22.311 WJR.

Medal table

References

External links
 Results website
 European Cycling Union
 Results book

European Track Championships, 2016
under-23
2016 in Italian sport